This article refers to the Sports broadcasting contracts in Greece. For a list of other country's broadcasting rights, see Sports television broadcast contracts.

Multi-discipline events
 Summer Olympics: ERT (2024)
 Summer Olympics: Eurosport (2024)
 Winter Olympics: ERT (2026)
 Winter Olympics: Eurosport (2026)
 Paralympics: ERT (2024, 2026)
 European Games: ERT (2023)

Basketball
Greek Basket League: ERT
Greek Basketball Cup: ERT
National Basketball Association: Cosmote Sport
NCAA: Nova Sports
Euroleague: Nova Sports
EuroCup Basketball: Nova Sports
Basketball Champions League: Cosmote Sport
Liga ACB: Cosmote Sport 
Lega Basket Serie A: Nova Sports
Turkish Basketball Super League: Cosmote Sport
VTB League: Cosmote Sport
FIBA EuroBasket: Nova Sports 
FIBA Basketball World Cup: Nova Sports
FIBA Intercontinental Cup: ERT

Association Football

Football 

FIFA World Cup: ANT1
FIFA World Cup qualification:
UEFA:
Nova Sports
Alpha TV 
UEFA Nations League:
Nova Sports
Alpha TV 
FIFA Women's World Cup: ERT, Eurovision
FIFA Youth World Cups: Eurovision
FIFA U-20 World Cup
FIFA U-17 World Cup
FIFA U-20 Women's World Cup
FIFA U-17 Women's World Cup
FIFA Club World Cup: ANT1
UEFA European Championship: ERT (until 2016 and from 2024 onwards), ANT1 (2020)
UEFA European Championship qualifying: Alpha TV (Greece matches only), Nova Sports
UEFA European Under-21 Championship: ERT
UEFA European Youth Championships: UEFA.tv, ERT
UEFA European Under-19 Championship
UEFA Women's Under-19 Championship
UEFA European Under-17 Championship
UEFA Women's Under-17 Championship
International Champions Cup: Nova Sports
UEFA Champions League: Cosmote Sport, and Mega channel (from 2021) 
UEFA Europa League: ERT (final only), Cosmote Sport
UEFA Conference League: Cosmote Sport
UEFA Super Cup: Cosmote Sport and Mega Channel (from 2021)
UEFA Youth League: Cosmote Sport
UEFA Women's Champions League: Cosmote Sport (final only)
Copa América: Open TV
Super League 1: Nova Sports, Cosmote Sport
Super League 2: ERT
Football League (Greece): ERT
Greek Football Cup: Cosmote Sport
Premier League: Nova Sports (until 2028)
English Championship: Cosmote Sport
Football League Cup: Action 24
FA Cup: Cosmote Sport 
La Liga: Nova Sports
Copa del Rey: Cosmote Sport
Supercopa de España: Nova Sports
Bundesliga: Nova Sports
DFB-Pokal: Nova Sports
Ligue 1: Nova Sports
Coupe de France: Nova Sports
Coupe de la Ligue: Nova Sports
Russian Premier League: Cosmote Sport
Russian Cup (football): Nova Sports
Primeira Liga: Cosmote Sport
Taça de Portugal: Mega 
Eredivisie: Nova Sports
Allsvenskan: Nova Sports
Serie A: Cosmote Sport
Coppa Italia: Nova Sports 
Eliteserien: Eurosport
A-League: YouTube
W-League: YouTube
K League: YouTube
AFC Champions League: Fanseat

Futsal 

 FIFA Futsal World Cup: Eurovision
 UEFA Futsal Championship: TBA
 UEFA Under-19 Futsal Championship: UEFA.tv
 UEFA Women's Futsal Championship: YouTube
 UEFA Futsal Champions League: Cosmote Sport (final four only)

Beach Soccer 

 FIFA Beach Soccer World Cup: Eurovision

Golf
PGA Championship: Nova Sports
Ryder Cup: Nova Sports
U.S. Open (golf): Nova Sports
PGA Tour: Golf TV

Boxing
Dream Boxing: DAZN: October 2022 to October 2025, all fights

Kickboxing
King of Kings: DAZN: October 2022 to October 2025, all fights

Mixed Martial Arts
Bushido MMA: DAZN: October 2022 to October 2025, all fights

Motor racing
Formula One: ANT1
MotoGP: Cosmote Sport
World Rally Championship: Cosmote Sport, ERT (Acropolis Rally only) 
Deutsche Tourenwagen Masters: Nova Sports

Rugby Union
European Rugby Champions Cup: RugbyPass
European Rugby Challenge Cup: RugbyPass 
Super Rugby: RugbyPass
The Rugby Championship: RugbyPass
Currie Cup: RugbyPass
Mitre 10 Cup: RugbyPass

Tennis
Australian Open: Eurosport
US Open: Eurosport
French Open: ERT, Eurosport
Wimbledon: Nova Sports
ATP Tour Masters 1000: Cosmote Sport

Volleyball
Greek Volleyball League: ERT
CEV Champions League: Cosmote Sport

Water polo
Greek Water Polo League: ERT

Handball
Greek Men's Handball Championship: ERT
EHF Champions League: Cosmote Sport

References

Greece
Television in Greece